Taylor "Tay" Baker is a retired American basketball coach.

He played basketball at Hamilton High School in Hamilton, Ohio, graduating in 1945. He played college basketball at the University of Cincinnati beginning as a freshman in 1947; however, after only three games he began an 18-month hitch in the U.S. Army before returning to the school in 1947. He played for three years and was a top reserve for the first Bearcats teams to win 20 games—23–5 in 1949 and, as a senior, 20–6 in 1950. Both seasons, in addition to his sophomore season, the Bearcats were champions of the Mid-American Conference (MAC).

He then was a teacher and coach at three southwestern Ohio high schools—first at Lebanon High School, then Wyoming High School and Miamisburg High School.

In 1959, he became an assistant coach at his college alma mater, Cincinnati, in 1959 under coach George Smith, a post he retained under Ed Jucker. After an assistant coaching career that included four Final Fours and two NCAA championships for the Bearcats, Baker succeeded Jucker as head coach in 1965.

His first team, in 1965–66, won the Missouri Valley Conference (MVC) title and played in the NCAA Tournament, where they were defeated by eventual national champion Texas Western (now UTEP). After posting a 17–9 record in 1971–72, Baker resigned as UC coach. In seven seasons coaching the Bearcats, Baker posted a record of went 125–60.

He moved to crosstown rival Xavier University in 1973, where he went 70–89 in six seasons.

Baker later served as executive director and board member of the non-profit Greater Cincinnati Golf Association which, among other functions, runs the local USGA qualifying tournaments.

In 1996, he was inducted into the University of Cincinnati Athletics Hall of Fame. In 2007, he was inducted into the Lebanon High School Athletic Hall of Fame.

Head coaching record

References

Year of birth missing (living people)
Living people
American men's basketball players
American men's basketball coaches
Basketball coaches from Ohio
Basketball players from Ohio
Cincinnati Bearcats men's basketball players
Cincinnati Bearcats men's basketball coaches
College men's basketball head coaches in the United States
High school basketball coaches in Ohio
Sportspeople from Hamilton, Ohio
Xavier Musketeers men's basketball coaches